Zucchetti is a surname. Notable people with the surname include:

Francesco Zucchetti (1902–1980), Italian racing cyclist
Lucia Zucchetti, Italian film editor
Pietro Zucchetti (born 1981), Italian sailor
Raul Zucchetti (born 1998), Italian footballer